Gece Gündüz is a police procedural soap produced by the Altıoklar Productions. The main characters are Aslan Aydemir (portrayed by Sarp Levendoğlu) and Kemal (portrayed by Settar Tanrıöğen). They both work at the Istanbul Organized Crime section of the police force. The series finished on its 33rd episode.

The theme song is an edited version of "Gündüz Gece" by Âşık Veysel Şatıroğlu, who is also named "Uzun Ince bir Yoldayım (I'm on a long thin road)", which was a famous Turkish folk music and Veysel was the famous one for this song.

Characters 
Sarp Levendoğlu - Chief inspector Aslan Aydemir
Aslan is a hotshot police officer around his early-30s. He lost his wife in a terrorist action while serving in the army (It is unknown as what though) against the PKK. He then has a romantic involvement with one of the other characters (Alev) and this later turns into a serious romance relationship towards the middle of the soap.
Settar Tanrıöğen - Chief Inspector Kemal
Kemal is an elder police officer more calmer than Aslan and has a family. He has a wife and three children, a male (Toprak) and two females (Lale and Akasya). CI Kemal always complains that he's retirement is coming up and then he wants to leave the force because he is so burned out and because Aslan is a crazier police officer, Kemal is a bit upset. He claims once that "I am not going to live to 2010" at the second episode.
İpek Özkök - Alev
At the start of the soap, Alev was just like an ordinary news reporter who was relentless and wanted to be one of the shining stars in the job. At first, she has a couple of run-ins that leave Aslan in hot water but as the soap progressed her love is surfaced.
Damla Sönmez - Pınar
She is rarely seen at the start and she later seems to dissolve throughout the middle of the soap. She is the sister of Alev. She, at first, was the more younger and casual person. Aggressive and non-responsible, it later affects her life badly. After the bad effect, she decided to put her life straight and studied more.
Bülent Şakrak - Sipsi
Sipsi is the non-police source of Aslan. As Sipsi is more into the gangs and the back alleys of Istanbul. Sipsi supplies Aslan with information about the criminals that Aslan is trying to apprehend. The latest is that he supplied Aslan and Kemal an energy efficient jeep looking van and that Aslan and Kemal always has problems with it.
Ushan Çakır - Yavuz
Yavuz is another police officer that work in the same department as Aslan and Kemal. He is around the same age as Aslan and is in love with Akasya, Kemal's daughter, that Kemal later finds out. Akasya is having problems with Yavuz about her work. This hinders their relationship and it seems that, at the current state, their relationship is at a breaking point. Kemal always refers to Yavuz as "Crazy Mad Guy" and "The second Aslan".
Ceren Olcay - Akasya
Akasya is the elder sister of Lale and Kemal's elder daughter. She has a relationship with Yavuz which seems to be in jeopardy. Akasya is an amateur actress, later turns professional, and that she started to show up in soaps and films. She spends most of her time on her work and this means that she has less time to spend with Yavuz as Yavuz always complains about this, it was him who put the ordering line and probably the end of the relationship.
"Make a decision, Your job or your family & friends (including me) life"
The soap hints that she picks her job and finalizes the relationship.
 Okan Albayrak - Optik
Optik, as referred by Aslan, is the technical member of the Organized Crime section. His job is mainly on the PC, which he at first complained about but as the soap progressed he is involved in the team, and he has a Platonic-style love against Yağmur.
 Gül Onat - Neriman
Neriman is Kemal's wife and the mother of Akasya, Toprak and Lale. Because Kemal's age he has some health issues that she overtly tries to help him regain. These include just giving him vegetables, which draws complaints from Kemal, etc.
 Ruken Demirer- Nazlı
Nazlı is Sipsi's female assistant. She makes Sipsi angry when she shows some promiscuous act against the crazy cop Aslan.
 Ayşen Gruda - Hayriye
Hayriye is Aslan's landlord and it seems that she also has an interest with him at first but this is later changed to show as she claimed at one point "I hired the house to you because you're a police officer" when Aslan was told about a Theory that there was a robber in the apartment. Hayriye had serious romantic feelings towards Kemal and when she learned out that Kemal is married to Neriman, she starts to play around and call Neriman, Keriman, which is another traditional Turkish Female and both given name and surname.

Turkish television soap operas
2008 Turkish television series debuts
2009 Turkish television series endings
Police procedural television series
Kanal D original programming
Show TV original programming
Turkish television series endings
Television shows set in Istanbul
Television series produced in Istanbul